On December 13, 1955, voters in  elected Democrat John Dingell to the U.S. House of Representatives. His father, John Dingell Sr., was the incumbent and died September 19, 1955. The younger Dingell was the longest-serving representative and went on to elect twenty-six more terms until he retired in 2014.

Results

See also 
 1954 United States House of Representatives elections

References

Sources 
 

Michigan 1955 15
Michigan 1955 15
1955 15
Michigan 15
United States House of Representatives 15
United States House of Representatives 1955 15